The Dochu La ( Dochu Pass, la means pass in Dzongkha) is a mountain pass in the snow covered Himalayas within Bhutan on the road from Thimphu to Punakha where 108 memorial chortens or stupas known as "Druk Wangyal Chortens" have been built by Ashi Dorji Wangmo Wangchuk, the eldest Queen Mother. Apart from the chortens there is a monastery called the Druk Wangyal Lhakhang (temple), built in honour of the fourth Druk Gyalpo (head of the state of Bhutan), Jigme Singye Wangchuck; the open grounds in its front yard is a venue for the annual Dochula Druk Wangyel Festival. The pass with 108 memorial chortens is adjacent to the countrys first Royal Botanical Park.

Geography

The road east of the pass runs steep for some distance and then takes a left turn towards Punakha Valley to the Punakha Dzong, in Punakha (the old capital of Bhutan), which is located at the confluence of two rivers. Further east the road reaches Wangdi Phodrong where there a 7th-century monastery on the ridge, and the valley is drained by the Punatsangchu River. The pass was part of ancient trails or tracks between Thimphu and Punakha, such as the Dochu La Nature Trail which begins at the Dochu La cafe and meets the present road at Lamperi, and the Lumitsawa Ancient Trail that joins the main road at Lumitsawa. Both trails are sections of the original route.

The weather at the pass generally remains foggy and chilly. However, between October and February, panoramic views of the Bhutan Himalayas can be seen.

The forest cover on the slopes of  the pass consists of cypress trees. The hill slopes around the pass are festooned with a profusion of colourful religious flags fixed by the Buddhist people as a mark of veneration. The flags, made in five colours representing the natural forces, — "blue (sky), white (clouds), red (fire), green (water) and yellow (earth)" – are inscribed with Buddhist scriptural prayers to usher prosperity and peace around the country. After the Losar festival in February, which marks the Bhutanese New Year, and as the snow melts, the pass provides a spectacle of many species of flowers such as the Primula denticulata, Primula bracteosa and in the subsequent month rhododendrons bloom in profusion.  Magnolia campbellii also bloom on the pass during this period. Another fragrant plant, which people come to enjoy,  is the Daphne which is a small shrub which blooms with white flowers amidst an array of prayer flags that are fixed on the slopes. The bark of this plant is used to make paper which is a traditional paper used for writing religious scriptures as it is termite free.

Landmarks
The landmarks around the pass include 108 Druk Wangyal Khang Zhang Chortens or stupas, the Druk Wangyal Lhakhang (temple), and the rhododendron garden which is part of the 47 km2 Royal Botanical Park.

Druk Wangyal Khang Zhang Chortens

The Druk Wangyal Khang Zhang Chortens are red-band or khangzang chortens, 108 in numbers,  built in a central hillock at the pass, under the patronage of the Queen Ashi Dorji Wangmo Wangchuk. In local language they are called  gYul Las rNampar Gyal wai''' chortens or chortens of victory. These were built as a memorial in honour of the Bhutanese soldiers who were killed in the December 2003 battle against Assamese insurgents from India. It particularly marks the victory of King Jigme Singye Wangchuck who dislodged the rebels from their camps (there were 30 camps) in Bhutanese territory from where they raiding Indian territory of Assam. After the war the king went back to Thimphu on 28 December 2003 and at this stage the 108 chortens were being built. They were completed in mid June 2004 and formally consecrated and sanctified with religious rites held on 19–20 June. 

 
The chortens are built in three layers, the first lowest level layer has forty five chortens, the second has thirty six and the top layer has twenty seven built around the main chorten. The construction of these chortens was done as per religiously ordained ritualistic procedures. As the height of the chortens attained 1 m a pit was excavated in ground in the centre, and symbolically offerings of grains and bronze utensil filled with butter were placed in the pit. At the next stage as the height of chortens increased, images of Buddhist gods made of clay stuffed with papers inscribed with prayers were interred. In the next stage, which is considered the "vital stage", in erecting a chorten was the fixing of the sokshing meaning "the life tree of the chorten". The sokshing, which is believed to provide a link between heaven and earth within a chorten, is in the form of a long square wooden pole made from a juniper tree made by an individual who has appropriate qualities from an astrological point of view. The pole was painted in red colour and inscribed with sacred hymns and banded with religious paraphernalia such as gilded images of gods, prayer bells, small clay stupas, and also precious stones and jewellery. The sokshing'' was then wrapped around by silk cloth and then fixed in the partly built chorten on an auspicious day.

Druk Wangyal Lhakhang

After completion of the chortens, building of a temple known as the Druk Wangyel Lhakhng, with the backdrop of "pristine" forest of the snow covered Himalayan mountains, was initiated and completed in June 2008. This was built as a memorial to celebrate 100 years of monarchy in Bhutan. Paintings on themes of Bhutanese history decorate the walls of the temple. Some of the murals are cartoonish. A few of the paintings relate to the fourth king fighting Indian rebels in the forest, monks with laptop, and a Druk Air plane. It appears like a "Bhutanese fusion of the 21st and 15th centuries".

Dochu La Wangyal Festival
The Dochula Druk Wangyel Tsechu (or Festival) is held annually on December 13, at Druk Wangyel Festival ground located at Dochula pass. This festival was established in 2011 to commemorate  victory of the Fourth Druk Gyalpo and the Armed Forces in 2003. A special Tsechu was composed for the occasion by Dasho Karma Ura which involved costumed mask dances.

References

Bibliography

External links

 Dochula Pass Tripadvisor Guide
Dochula Pass Travel Guide

Mountain passes of the Himalayas
Mountain passes of Bhutan